António Antunes Baeta Rodrigues Areia (born 21 June 1990) is a Portuguese handball player for FC Porto and the Portuguese national team.

He represented Portugal at the 2020 European Men's Handball Championship.

References

External links
 
 

1990 births
Living people
Portuguese male handball players
Sportspeople from Lisbon
FC Porto handball players
S.L. Benfica handball players
Handball players at the 2020 Summer Olympics